Tennis was contested at the 2013 Summer Universiade from July 8 to 16 at the Tennis Academy in Kazan, Russia. Men's and women's singles, men's and women's team, and men's, women's, and mixed doubles events was contested.

Medal summary

Medal table

Medal events

See also
 Tennis at the Summer Universiade

References

External links
2013 Summer Universiade – Tennis
Results book

 
2013
Summer Universiade
2013 Summer Universiade events